FK Beograd is a defunct football club based in Karaburma, Belgrade, Serbia.

History
After winning the Belgrade Zone League in the 1993–94 season, the club finished as runners-up in the 1994–95 Serbian League North and earned promotion to the Second League of FR Yugoslavia through the playoffs. They were placed 16th in their debut season in the second tier. In the 1999–2000 season, the club placed first in the Second League of FR Yugoslavia (Group North), but ceded its 2000–01 First League of FR Yugoslavia spot to Sartid Smederevo. They instead spent the next four seasons in the second tier, before suffering relegation in 2004. Over the following eight years, the club participated in the Serbian League Belgrade. They finished runners-up in the 2005–06 season. In July 2012, it was announced that FK Beograd failed to renew its registration, while a new club was founded as FK Beograd 1929.

Honours
Second League of FR Yugoslavia (Tier 2)
 1999–2000 (Group North)
Belgrade Zone League (Tier 4)
 1993–94

Seasons

Notable players
This is a list of players who have played at full international level.
  Mario Božić
  Branislav Jovanović
  Miloš Simonović
  Nenad Mladenović
  Boris Sekulić
For a list of all FK Beograd players with a Wikipedia article, see :Category:FK Beograd players.

Managerial history

References

External links
 Club page at Srbijasport

1929 establishments in Serbia
2012 disestablishments in Serbia
Association football clubs disestablished in 2012
Association football clubs established in 1929
Defunct football clubs in Serbia
Football clubs in Belgrade
Palilula, Belgrade